Płowce may refer to the following places:
Płowce in Kuyavian-Pomeranian Voivodeship (north-central Poland)
Płowce, Subcarpathian Voivodeship (south-east Poland)
Płowce, Warmian-Masurian Voivodeship (north Poland)